Chukwuma Chinekezi Oparah  is an Anglican bishop in Nigeria.

Oparah is the current Bishop of Owerri.

He was born on 26 October 1969 in Dimoma Obuzi, Amankuta Mbieri in  Mbaitoli, Imo State.

He has a PhD in Biblical Studies and an MA in Religious Studies from the University of Uyo and a BA from the University of Nigeria, Nsukka, a Diploma in Theology from Trinity (Union) Theological College, Umuahia and a Bachelor’s Degree in Theology from Trinity College of Ministerial Arts, Aba.

He was Archdeacon of Ibeama Ogwa Archdeaconry until he was elected  Bishop of Owerri on 18 September 2018 at the Cathedral Church of St. Peter's, Minna, Diocese of Minna, Niger State.

Notes

1969 births
Anglican bishops of Owerri
21st-century Anglican bishops in Nigeria
University of Uyo alumni
University of Nigeria alumni
Trinity Theological College, Umuahia alumni
Living people